Syed Muhammad Ali Shah (26 October 1946 – 4 February 2013) was a Pakistani orthopaedic surgeon and member of the Pakistan Cricket Board governing board. He was the Provincial Sports Minister of Sindh. He was also the Chief de Mission for Pakistani athletes in the Commonwealth Games 2010.

Early life
Shah was born on 26 October 1946 in Bareilly. His father, Syed Asghar Ali Shah, served as a judge for many years.

Career

As surgeon 
Shah returned to Pakistan from England to establish himself as an orthopedic surgeon in Karachi and soon set up his own orthopedic and trauma hospital, the AO Clinic. In his career he is estimated to have performed about 76,000 operations.

As politician
Shah was a member of the Muttahida Qaumi Movement. In the 2008 general election, he was elected to the Sindh Assembly from PS-103 (North Nazimabad, Karachi). He became Minister of Sports of the province of Sindh in 2008.

With cricket
Shah was also known for his passion for the sports of Cricket. He devoted 10 per cent of the AO Clinic's revenues to supporting cricket in Pakistan, and in 1993 he created Asghar Ali Shah Cricket Stadium in North Nazimabad, Karachi. The stadium hosts the Dr Mohammad Ali Shah Night Twenty20 Cricket Tournament every year in the month of Ramadan.

In October 2012, Shah was credited as having played an instrumental role in reviving international cricket in the country after a period of three and a half years when, in his capacity as Sindh sports minister, he arranged an international world XI team – consisting of former and current players from Sri Lanka, South Africa, West Indies, United States and Afghanistan – to play two T20 matches against a "Pakistan All Stars" consisting mainly of players from the national team. While the matches were unofficial, they were seen as a milestone as this was the first instance when foreign players toured Pakistan to play cricket since the attack on the Sri Lankan team.

2010 Commonwealth Games opening ceremony flag controversy

Awards

References

External links
 

Muhajir people
People from Bareilly
Pakistani orthopaedic surgeons
Recipients of the Pride of Performance
Recipients of Sitara-i-Imtiaz
Recipients of Tamgha-e-Imtiaz
Pakistani cricket commentators
Muttahida Qaumi Movement MPAs (Sindh)
1946 births
2013 deaths
Politicians from Karachi
Sindh MPAs 2008–2013